Patrick O'Connell may refer to:

 Patrick O'Connell (actor) (1934–2017), Irish film and television actor
 Patrick O'Connell (chef) (born 1945), author, chef, and owner of the Inn at Little Washington
 Patrick O'Connell (footballer) (1887–1959), Irish footballer and manager
 Patrick O'Connell (poet) (1944–2005), Canadian poet
 Paddy O'Connell (born 1966), BBC TV presenter
 Paddy O'Connell (Gaelic footballer) (1888–1980), Irish Gaelic footballer
 Pat O'Connell (surfer) (born 1971), American surfer
 Pat O'Connell (baseball) (1861–1943), Major League Baseball center fielder
 Pat O'Connell (footballer) (born 1937), English footballer
 Patrick O'Connell, the husband of American actress Maggie Baird and father of American singer-songwriters Billie Eilish and Finneas O'Connell